Dr. Patrick Stephen Herendeen (born 1959) is an American botanist with expertise in paleobotany and evolutionary biology of Cretaceous Age fossil plants. He is the Senior Director of Systematics and Evolutionary Biology and Senior Scientist at the Chicago Botanic Garden and teaches at Northwestern University. Herendeen is the president of the International Association for Plant Taxonomy.

References

Botanists active in North America
20th-century American botanists
21st-century American botanists
Living people
1959 births